The 2018 Austin mayoral election was held on November 6, 2018 to elect the mayor of Austin, Texas. The election was a non-partisan mayoral election. If a candidate received a majority of the votes (50%+1 or greater), the candidate was elected, otherwise a runoff would be held between the top two candidates with the most votes. As incumbent Steve Adler secured a majority in the first round, a runoff was not required, and Adler was re-elected mayor for a second term.

Campaign
Adler entered the election with a strong fundraising advantage over his challengers.

Adler's most formidable challenger was perceived to be former Austin City Council member Laura Morrison. Morrison had been a prominent critic of CodeNEXT (a shelved effort to rewrite the city's land development code) and the deal Adler was offering to bring a Major League Soccer team to the city.

Election results

References

2018 Texas elections
2018 United States mayoral elections
2018
Non-partisan elections